Sanzhuang could refer to the following locations in China:

 Sanzhuang Township, Hebei, in Xinhua District, Shijiazhuang, Hebei, China
 Sanzhuang Township, Jiangsu, in Siyang County, Jiangsu, China
 Sanzhuang, Shandong, town in Donggang District, Rizhao, Shandong, China